Lurago may refer to:

Geography 
 Lurago d'Erba, Italian municipality
 Lurago Marinone, Italian municipality

People 
 Carlo Lurago, Italian architect
 Rocco Lurago, Italian architect